The Libyan presidential election had originally been planned for 10 December 2018, but was delayed due to Khalifa Haftar's Western Libya campaign. The election was thereafter scheduled to be held on 24 December 2021 but was indefinitely postponed after the head of the High National Election Commission (HNEC) ordered the dissolution of the electoral committees nationwide.

Background

2017
In a surprise offensive on 3 March 2017, the Islamist-dominated Benghazi Defense Brigades seized a number of oil ports from the Libyan National Army-backed House of Representatives. On 7 March 2017, the ports were handed over to the Government of National Accord, prompting the House of Representatives to abandon the UN-brokered peace deal it had previously agreed to with that government, denouncing the BDB capture of the ports as "terrorist attacks". The House then called for Libya's electoral commission to make "all the necessary arrangements to prepare for presidential and parliamentary elections before February 2018".

2018
In May 2018, talks occurred in Paris, France, where leaders of the Government of National Accord and representatives of Haftar's Libyan National Army agreed on establishing a legal framework by 16 September to hold parliamentary and presidential elections on 10 December. The four people who agreed to deal were: Fayez al-Sarraj (head of the Government of National Accord), Khalifa Haftar (head of the Libyan National Army), Aguila Saleh Issa (head of the House of Representatives), and Khalid al-Mishri (head of the High Council of State). This was supported by the final report of the Centre for Humanitarian Dialogue for the preparatory phase of the Libyan National Conference, which stated that Libyans participating in the consultative process "expressed fatigue and frustration with the current political situation and called for an election or other major change to usher in a new system".

In July, French Foreign Minister Jean-Yves Le Drian visited Libya to speak with GNA Prime Minister Fayez al-Sarraj on making sure the elections went forward, and announcing that France donated US$1 million for the election. The Italian Prime Minister Giuseppe Conte stated in early August 2018 that he doubted that elections would be held at the end of the year, despite France's push, and Italian ambassador to Libya Giuseppe Perrone echoed this view. The Italian embassy in Tripoli later denied that Perrone was trying to delay the election after his statements were criticized by the Libyan House of Representatives. Ghassan Salamé, the United Nations representative in Libya, stated that an election in December 2018 would be unlikely due to the ongoing fighting.

In November 2018, major Libyan political figures attended the two-day Palermo Conference in an attempt to resolve the Libyan Conflict, but without a breakthrough.

2019
One of the major aims of the Libyan National Conference, which was initially scheduled for 14–16 April 2019, but postponed by the start of Haftar's military operation to take control of Tripoli from the GNA, was to recommend methods and dates of the 2019 elections to the Libyan House of Representatives and High Council of State.

According to resolution 8/2013 of the General National Congress (GNC), the body responsible for the practical aspects of organising the elections is the High National Elections Commission (HNEC). HNEC is expected to follow the procedures outlined in resolution 17/2013 of the GNC. , the HNEC Board consisted of Emad Alshadly al-Sayah, Rabab Mohammed Halab, Abdelhakim Alshaab Belkhair and Abubakr Ali Marda.

The 2019 Libyan local elections took place in 20 localities, prior to the parliamentary and presidential elections, in March and April 2019, with further planned elections in other towns during 2019. The local elections are coordinated by the Central Commission of Municipal Council Elections in close cooperation with HNEC.

In 2019, Libyan Speaker of the House Aguila Saleh announced that elections could be held in 2020.

2020
On 16 September 2020, Fayez al-Sarraj stated that he would step down from his position by the end of October 2020. This took place after the first month of the start of the 2020 Libyan protests in Tripoli, Benghazi and other cities across Libya.

2021
On 23 September 2021, Haftar temporarily withdrew his post from the command of the LNA for a potential run in the election. Under Libyan law, officials must suspend their current work three months before participating in the election.

Postponement 
Various postponements have resulted from disputes about fundamental rules governing the election, including the voting timetable, the eligibility of the main candidates and the eventual powers of the next president and parliament.

Days before the first round was scheduled to take place, the election was already up in the air, with no official list of candidates presented to the public and no formal campaigning under way. On 22 December the parliament of Libya confirmed the postponement. The chairman of the election committee said, ”After consulting the technical, judicial and security reports, we inform you of the impossibility of holding the elections on the date of 24 December 2021, provided for by the electoral law,” without giving a new date. Foreign Policy summarized that the causes for the delay were that "the process was beleaguered by two interrelated issues: differences over the idea of holding a presidential election in the current context, and the resulting failure to reach the required consensus on a framework for elections".

The United Kingdom, France, Germany, Italy and the United States urged Libya to set a new date for delayed presidential election quickly. The HNEC insisted that the House of Representatives is responsible for setting the new date. Speaker of the House of Representatives Aguila Saleh said the election committee responsible for overseeing elections must set a "definitive" date for postponed presidential and legislative polls by the end of January.

The U.N.'s special adviser on Libya, Stephanie Williams, who has pursued a new election date, told the Associated Press that it was still "very reasonable and possible" for the country's 2.8 million voters to cast their ballots by June 2022 in line with the U.N.-brokered roadmap.

On 23 January 2022, interim Prime Minister Abdulhamid Dbeibeh called for a constitution to be established before holding the delayed presidential and parliamentary elections. A month later, on 22 February, Dbeibeh announced a plan to hold the elections in June 2022. He later proposed holding elections at the end of 2022.

Since then, the voting has not taken place and the plans have unraveled and left the country in crisis, although Dbeibeh is reported by his allies to be working on these issues. One reason given is the inability to agree on banning military personnel as well as dual citizens from running in the elections.

Electoral system 
The President of Libya is elected through two-round system for a five-year term.

2.83 million people were registered to vote in the Libyan election as of August 2021.

Presidential candidates
Registration for presidential candidates opened on 7 November and lasted until 22 November. Saif al-Islam Gaddafi, son of former Libyan leader Muammar Gaddafi, registered his candidacy on 14 November 2021. Khalifa Haftar, commander of the Libyan National Army, registered his candidacy on 16 November. Aref Nayed, Chairman of the Ihya Libya Party, submitted his candidacy on 17 November 2021. Prime Minister Abdul Hamid Dbeibeh registered his candidacy on 21 November. Abdel Moneim al-Houni, former Foreign Minister and founding member of the Libyan Revolutionary Command Council, registered his candidacy on 22 November. In total, 96 men and two women registered as candidates.

A preliminary list of 73 presidential candidates was released by the HNEC on 24 November. Twenty-five candidates were disqualified from the election, including Saif al-Islam Gaddafi, Nouri Abusahmain, Bashir Saleh Bashir, and Ali Zeidan. Gaddafi, Abusahmain, and Saleh were disqualified under Article 10/7 of the electoral law for having been convicted of a crime. Gaddafi was also disqualified under Article 17/5 for not providing a certificate showing a clean criminal record. Zeidan was disqualified under Article 10/2 for having more than one nationality and under Article 11 for not having 5000 supporters. According to the electoral law, any appeals against the disqualifications are to be decided by the judiciary.

On 28 November, the Tripoli Appeals Court rejected the candidacy of current prime minister Abdul Hamid Dbeibeh after accepting two appeals against his bid. The first appeal was filed by presidential candidates Aref Ali Nayed, Othman Abdeljalil, Mohammed Al-Muntasser, and Libyan Political Dialogue Forum members Ahmed Al-Sharkasi and Al-Saida Al-Yakoubi, while the second appeal was filed by presidential candidate Fathi Bashagha.

On 30 November, Libyan Field Marshal Khalifa Haftar was disqualified from the presidential election after the Zawiya Court of First Instance accepted an appeal against his candidacy.

On 1 December, four candidates disqualified by the HNEC, Abdul Hamid Dbeibeh, Nouri Abusahmain, Salama Al-Ghweil, and Fathi Benshatwan were placed back on the ballot by the Tripoli Court of Appeal.

On 2 December, Saif al-Islam Gaddafi was placed back on the ballot after the Sabha Court of Appeal accepted his appeal against his disqualification from the list of presidential candidates.

On 6 December, Khalifa Haftar returned to the presidential election after the Tripoli Court of Appeal rejected a 30 November ruling by the lower Zawiya court.

Declared

Polling

First round

Second round

Dbeibeh vs. Gaddafi

Dbeibeh vs. Haftar

Bashagha vs. Gaddafi

Bashagha vs. Haftar

Dbeibeh vs. Bashagha

Gaddafi vs. Haftar

See also
High National Election Commission

Notes

References

External links
High National Elections Commission

Elections in Libya
Future elections in Africa
Libya